Mom, I Need to be a Girl is a work of non-fiction by "Just Evelyn", the mother of a transgender former teenager. It recounts how her daughter Danielle Lindenmuth (born Daniel) began transitioning from male to female at 15, and completed sex reassignment surgery at 18, with the support of the author and her sons. Evelyn wrote the book and published it in 1998 because she could not find similar resources available to the families of transgender people, especially teenagers. The book has been recommended by various transgender support resources, and is available in print and for free online.

Quotes 
 "I would never wear your funky old clothes, you are a woman and can do all those things, and yet you don't. That's such a waste!" - Danielle Lindenmuth
"Is a mother's love enough?" - Just Evelyn

See also

List of transgender-related topics
Transgender publications

References

External links 
 Mom, I need to be a girl in PDF
 Transsexual Women's Success Page 2 featuring a picture of Danielle
 Mom, I need to be a girl page linked from Transsexual Woman's Success

1998 non-fiction books
Transgender non-fiction books
1990s LGBT literature
Biographies about LGBT people